Marina Soboleva (born 27 January 1961) is a Soviet fencer. She competed in the women's team foil event at the 1988 Summer Olympics.

References

External links
 

1961 births
Living people
Russian female foil fencers
Soviet female foil fencers
Olympic fencers of the Soviet Union
Fencers at the 1988 Summer Olympics
Martial artists from Moscow
Universiade medalists in fencing
Universiade bronze medalists for the Soviet Union
Medalists at the 1985 Summer Universiade